Madison Snow (born December 26, 1995) is an American racing driver who currently competes in the IMSA SportsCar Championship.

Career

Porsche Cup
After just over a decade spent in karting, Snow moved to sports car racing in 2010, competing for a short time in Miatas before transitioning into the IMSA GT3 Cup Challenge for 2011. In his opening season of Porsche cup competition, at just 15 years of age, Snow was crowned Gold Class champion, winning six of the 15 scheduled races and collecting 12 podiums. Two years later, he was crowned champion of the Platinum class, making him the youngest overall champion in series history. 

At Attached 2013 24 Hours of Daytona, Madison and his mother Melanie became the first mother/son pairing in the race's history. At the tail end of the 2013 season, Snow was drafted in to complete Flying Lizard Motorsports' Petit Le Mans lineup alongside Spencer Pumpelly and Nelson Canache Jr. The team would finish the race as class winners. Due to his successes in the Porsche GT3 Cup car over the course of the previous three seasons, Snow was also invited to take part in the North American Porsche Youth Driver Academy at Barber Motorsports Park. 

Alongside a full-season drive in the newly-formed IMSA SportsCar Championship with his family-owned team, Snow also competed with Extreme Speed Motorsports for a partial schedule in the Cooper Tires Prototype Lites during the 2014 season. Tallying three podiums in IMSA, he finished 7th in the GTD-class standings alongside co-driver Jan Heylen.

Paul Miller Racing
After running a partial season in 2015 with Wright Motorsports and Park Place Motorsports, Snow returned to full-time IMSA competition in 2016 with Paul Miller Racing. Finishing 3rd in his opening season, Snow returned to the team for the following two seasons. In 2018, he and co-driver Bryan Sellers were crowned class champions, netting two victories and eight podiums to extend a four point gap over second-placed Katherine Legge. Snow promptly left the team, electing to focus on his family business, Universal Industrial Sales. 

Snow left as a result of driver rating adjustments that would have prevented him from competing with Sellers and Paul Miller Racing the following season. While his FIA Drivers' Categorization status would remain Silver, defining him as an amateur driver, IMSA was set to upgrade his status to Gold, defining him as a professional driver in IMSA-organized competitions. Due to competition requirements that GTD class entries must field one professional and one amateur driver, Snow would not have been able to continue alongside Sellers due to both holding a professional status, contributing to his decision to end his racing career.

However, his retirement was rather short-lived. IMSA rescinded their promotion after Snow sat out the 2019 season, and he returned to Paul Miller Racing full-time in 2020. As the COVID-19 pandemic caused the team to run a partial schedule, Snow also competed for Change Racing in the Lamborghini Super Trofeo North America, claiming the Pro class title while brother McKay won the Pro-Am class alongside Corey Lewis. In 2021, Snow joined Zelus Motorsports ahead of their GT World Challenge America debut.

Racing record

Career summary
 
* Season still in progress.

Complete WeatherTech SportsCar Championship results
(key) (Races in bold indicate pole position)

* Season still in progress.

References

External links
Madison Snow at Motorsport.com

1995 births
Living people
American racing drivers
Rolex Sports Car Series drivers
American Le Mans Series drivers
WeatherTech SportsCar Championship drivers
Porsche Supercup drivers
24 Hours of Daytona drivers
GT World Challenge America drivers
Lamborghini Super Trofeo drivers